{{Infobox television
| image                = The Legends of Treasure Island DVD.jpg
| caption              = US DVD cover
| genre                = Animated series
| based_on             = {{Based on|Treasure Island|Robert Louis Stevenson}}
| runtime              = 22–25 minutes
| editor               = Andi Sloss
| producer             = Peter Lewis
| developer            = 
| director             = Dino AthanassiouSimon Ward-Horner
| starring             = Dawn FrenchJohn HaslerJuliet StevensonCorinna PowleslandRichard E. GrantRob BrydonRobert PowellHugh LaurieChris BarrieRob RackstrawGary MartinCarla MendonçaIssy Van RandwyckWilliam MaxwellDavid HoltLeslie RandallShona MorrisJimmy Hibbert
| country              = United Kingdom
| language             = English
| company              = FilmFairCentral Independent TelevisionCarlton UK Productions
| network              = ITV Network (CITV)
| picture_format       = PAL
| audio_format         = Dolby Surround
| first_aired          = 
| last_aired           = 
| num_seasons          = 2
| num_episodes         = 26
}}The Legends of Treasure Island is a British animated television series. It had two series of 13 episodes each and each episode runs for 22–25 minutes.

The series was loosely based on Robert Louis Stevenson's original 1883 novel Treasure Island. Featuring a mysterious and dark storyline, it incorporates magic and many new characters. Billy Bones is not in this series, instead Jim's father Mr. Hawkins is in his place. It was broadcast in the United Kingdom and in other countries throughout Europe and Asia and was also aired in Australia on ABC TV Network. The programme was a FilmFair production for Central Independent Television.

As of 2021, The Legends of Treasure Island is owned by ITV plc.

Characters
This cartoon, unlike most other Treasure Island cartoons and movies, featured the main characters as anthropomorphic animals:

Jim Hawkins: Dog: The main protagonist, he is cunning for his age, and determined to reach the treasure as his father asked him.
Ben Gunn: Dog: A hermit found living on the Island, he knows more about the dangers of the Island and is able to provide warnings. He frequently describes things as being "like a leech" and often speaks in very vague terms that can be hard to understand.
Long John Silver: Fox: Unlike the book and most adaptations, Long John Silver is not an anti-hero with dubious morality but rather a straight villain, although he does save Jim's life in episode 3.
Dr. Livesey: Dog: Is a friend of Jim and his father, and aids the boy against the pirates.
Captain Smollett: Dog: A brave captain who offers Jim his aid. When Jim states that he cannot pay Smollett, he states that he will accept a new pair of boots after they find the treasure as payment. He is also the one who decides to go to Squire Trelawney for funding, as the two are close friends.
Squire Trelawney: Giant Pigeon: Squire Trelawney is a friendly, yet money-obsessed character, who is only convinced to fund the expedition upon hearing the promise of treasure. He often acts as if he doesn't have a clue what he's doing, despite supposedly having gone on many adventures.
Blind Pew: Giant Rat: The mysterious blind boss of Long John Silver.
Jane: Vixen: One of the exclusive characters for this Treasure Island incarnation. Jane was kidnapped by Silver to be held for ransom, but since her parents did not want her, he got stuck with her. In the first episode, she switches sides and teams up with Jim, for whom she showed growing feelings as the series progressed.

Subsidiary recurring characters included the pirates Morgan (a hog), Nebbich (a hyena), and Rat (who was, ostensibly enough, a rat). These characters featured mainly in the first season and only made minor appearances at the beginning of the second before disappearing altogether. Other minor pirates except Israel Hands seen during series 1 included a weasel and a rabbit among others.

Cast
 Series 1 
Dawn French as Jim Hawkins
Juliet Stevenson as Jane
Richard E. Grant as Long John Silver
Robert Powell as Dr. Livesey
Hugh Laurie as Squire Trelawney
Chris Barrie as Captain Smollett / Ben Gunn
Rob Rackstraw as Pew [uncredited]
Jimmy Hibbert as Nebbich / Rat / Weasel [uncredited]
Gary Martin as Merman Prince in ep 12, Additional Voices
Carla Mendonça as Additional Voices

Series 2
John Hasler as Jim Hawkins
Hugh Laurie as Squire Trelawney
Chris Barrie as Captain Smollett / Ben Gunn
Rob Brydon as Long John Silver
Corinna Powlesland as Jane
Rob Rackstraw as Pew [uncredited]
Carla Mendonça as Sea Witch / Small Mole [uncredited]
William Maxwell as Dave
David Holt as Boil
Leslie Randall
Shona Morris as Mad Meg
Issy Van Randwyck as Mother of small mole
Jimmy Hibbert as Nebbich / Rat / Weasel [uncredited]

Episodes
Series overview

Season 1 (1993)

Season 2 (1995)

The order commonly listed (Flint's Return as ep. 5, The Cave of Babel as ep. 6, City in the Sky as ep. 20, Antidote as ep. 21 etc.) is taken from the Australian VHS releases and is possibly a production order.

Broadcast
  U.K.
 ITV (CITV, 1993–1995)
 Carlton Kids (1998–1999)
  Australia
 ABC TV (1995–1996, 1999–2000)
 7two (2010)
  Ireland
 RTÉ 1 (1996)
 Network 2 (The Den, 1995–1996)
  U.A.E.
 Dubai 33
  South Africa
 SABC 2 (1998–1999)
  Namibia
 NBC (1994–????)
  Poland
 TVP2 (1995–1996, 1998)
  Italy
 Rete 4 (1996–1997)
  France
 Canal+ (1993)
 Canaille Peluche (1993)
 FR3 (1994–1995)
 Les Minikeums (1994–1995)
 The Disney Channel (1999)
  Singapore
 Channel 5 (Take 5, 1993–1996)
  Malaysia
 MetroVision (1995)
  Jordan
 Channel 2
  Germany
 BFBS (Children's SSVC)
 SSVC Television (Children's SSVC'')
  Russia
 Channel One Russia (1995–1996)
  Pakistan
 PTV
  Brunei
 RTB
  Thailand
 IBC 7
  New Zealand
 TV2
  Kuwait
 KTV2
  Indonesia
 ANTV

Trivia & Home Media Releases
The episode Reunion in series 2 was aired out of order, probably due to the episode being produced following the first episode. It was aired and released on home video in Australia as the 2nd episode of series 2, while chronologically it is the 4th episode.
When The Legends of Treasure Island got its solo video release in the UK from Pickwick Video, it had 3 episodes; it omits the 2nd episode Memories Are Made of This, but it does contain the 1st, 3rd and 4th episode from series 1.
Although it was a UK show, the entire series was not made available on video there. The entire 26 episodes however were released on video in Australia by Reel Entertainment, with 12 volumes released.
A TV movie version featuring select episodes from series 1 of the show was released on Video & DVD in the US by Image Entertainment. Both releases are now out of print.

References

External links
The series description at Toonhound
 

1990s British children's television series
1990s British animated television series
1993 British television series debuts
1995 British television series endings
British children's animated adventure television series
British children's animated drama television series
ITV children's television shows
English-language television shows
Television shows produced by Central Independent Television
Television series by FilmFair
Television series by DHX Media
Television series by Cookie Jar Entertainment
Television series based on Treasure Island
Australian Broadcasting Corporation original programming
Television series by ITV Studios